The Djibouti National Olympic and Sports Committee (IOC code: DJI) is the National Olympic Committee representing Djibouti.

See also
 Djibouti at the Olympics

References

Djibouti
Djibouti at the Olympics